King Faisal Hospital may refer to:

 King Faisal Specialist Hospital and Research Centre, in Riyadh, Saudi Arabia
 King Faisal Hospital (Kigali), in Kigali, Rwanda